The Cybiko is a Russian handheld computer introduced in the United States by David Yang's company Cybiko Inc. as a retail test market in New York on April 2000, and rolled out nationwide in May 2000. It is designed for teens, featuring its own two-way radio text messaging system. It has over 430 "official" freeware games and applications. It features a rubber QWERTY keyboard. An MP3 player add-on with a SmartMedia card slot was made for the unit as well. The company stopped manufacturing the units after two product versions and a few years on the market. Several Cybikos can chat with each other in a wireless chatroom. By the end of 2000, the Cybiko Classic had sold over 500,000 units.

Models

Cybiko Classic 
There are two models of the Classic Cybiko. Visually, the only difference is that the original version has a power switch on the side, while the updated version uses the "escape" key for power management. Internally, the differences between the two models are in the internal memory and the firmware location.

The CPU is a Hitachi H8S/2241 clocked at 11.0592 MHz and the Cybiko Classic also has an Atmel AT90S2313 co-processor, clocked at 4 MHz to provide some support for RF communications. It has 512KB flash memory-based ROM flash memory and 256KB RAM installed. An add-on slot is located in the rear.

The Cybiko Classics have five colors: blue, purple, neon green, white, and black. The black version has a yellow keypad, instead of the white unit found on other Cybikos.

The add-on slot has the same pin arrangement as a PC card, but it is not electrically compatible.

Cybiko Xtreme 

The Cybiko Xtreme is the second-generation Cybiko handheld. It features various improvements over the original Cybiko, such as a faster processor, more RAM, more ROM, a new operating system, a new keyboard layout and case design, greater wireless range, a microphone, improved audio output, and smaller size.

The CPU is a Hitachi H8S/2323 at 18 MHz, and like the original version, it also has an Atmel AT90S2313 co-processor at 4 MHz to provide some support for RF communications. 512KiB ROM flash memory and 1.5MiB RAM is installed. It features an add-on slot in the rear, which is compatible with the MP3 player.

It was released in two variants. US variant (Model No. CY44801) has frequency range of 902-928 MHz and European variant (Model No. CY44802) with frequency range of 868-870 MHz. No other functional difference exists between these variants.

Options

MP3 player 
Classic MP3 Player: The MP3 player for the Classic plugs into the bottom of the Cybiko and used SmartMedia cards; it can support a maximum size of 64 MB. The player has built-in controls.
Xtreme MP3 Player: The MP3 player plugs into the rear of the Cybiko Xtreme. It has a slot for one MMC memory card. The MP3 player can only be controlled from the Cybiko. A memory card from the MP3 player can also be addressed from the Cybiko and used for data and program storage.

1MB Expansion Memory 
The memory expansion card plugs into the rear of the Cybiko. It provides 256 kilobytes of static RAM, and 1 megabyte of data flash memory. The RAM allows programs with larger memory requirements to run. The data flash allows more programs to be stored. Some Cybiko programs will not run unless the Expansion Memory is plugged in.

Games 
A large number of games were produced for the Cybiko. Programs were posted daily on the website and can be downloaded using the CyberLoad application. Many of the games have a multiplayer mode with automatic saves, allowing players to resume the game if their connection is lost.

The first games on the Cybiko were originally made in the classic board game genre – chess, checkers, backgammon, kalah, renju and seega. The "casual" puzzle games Phat Cash and Tooty Fruity were also made, with the latter requiring the Cybiko to be rotated horizontally to play. A first-person shooter engine was written on which Lost in Labyrinth is built, similar in gameplay to Wolfenstein 3D. The popular skateboarding game Blazing Boards is based on the racing engine which was later used as the basis for Tony Hawk's Pro Skater for cell phones, in a collaboration between Cybiko and THQ. Among the turn-based and real-time strategy games are Warfare and Land of Kings, with the latter requiring a memory card to work.

The flagship game on the system is CyLandia, which combines the tamagotchi and economic strategy genres. Cybiko devices with the game installed have pets called Cy-B (also called "cypets"), which the player has to raise. The game continues even when the devices are turned off, and in case of insufficient attention, the Cy-Bs can "escape" to any other Cybiko in range. Players can also voluntarily send pets to other devices.

Toward the end of the Cybiko's lifecycle, quest and RPG genre games were being developed, but were not released. However, the fighting game Knight's Tournament contains role-playing elements, where player characters can be outfitted with various equipment won in tournaments. After the September 11 attacks, a problem of game censorship emerged, which led to the cancellation of the beat-'em-up game Renegade  by the American management, in part because the main character is a police officer who beats up hooligans.

Comparison

References 

Personal digital assistants
Handheld game consoles
Sixth-generation video game consoles
Computer-related introductions in 2000
Mesh networking